John Moran Tully (1 December 1885 – 27 October 1966) was an Australian politician. He was a Labor member of the New South Wales Legislative Assembly from 1925 to 1932 and from 1935 to 1946.

Born at Mulgoa to railway officer Peter Tully and teacher Sarah Lovat, he attended St Patrick's College in Goulburn before becoming a public servant. He was an assistant at the public library from 1903 to 1908 and a draughtsman at the Registrar General's Department from 1908 to 1925 and 1932 to 1935. On 4 October 1916 he married Dorothy Kitching, with whom he had two sons.

He had joined the Labor Party in 1913 and became president of the Chatswood branch. In 1925 he was elected to the New South Wales Legislative Assembly for Goulburn. He became Secretary for Lands in 1930, but lost his seat in 1932. He returned to the Assembly in 1935, and was again appointed Secretary for Lands in 1941. He resigned in 1946 to accept appointment as Agent-General for New South Wales in London, and was succeeded by his son Laurie.

References

 

|-

1885 births
1966 deaths
Members of the New South Wales Legislative Assembly
Australian Labor Party members of the Parliament of New South Wales
20th-century Australian politicians
Agents-General for New South Wales